Christian Onof is a British philosopher and engineering mathematician. He is Reader in Stochastic Environmental Systems at Imperial College London and Honorary Research Fellow in the Department of Philosophy at Birkbeck College London.
He is known for his works on Kantian philosophy. Onof is a co-founder of the journal Episteme.

See also
Stigmergy
Friedrich Hölderlin

References

External links
Onof at Imperial College London
Personal Website

21st-century British philosophers
Philosophy academics
Living people
Academics of Imperial College London
Alumni of Imperial College London
21st-century British engineers
Alumni of University College London
Year of birth missing (living people)
21st-century British mathematicians